Pérrine Moncrieff  (née Millais; 8 February 1893 – 16 December 1979) was a New Zealand writer, conservationist and amateur ornithologist.

Biography
She was born in London, England in 1893 as Pérrine Millais. She was the grand daughter of the painter Sir John Millais, one of the founders of the Pre-Raphaelite Brotherhood. She spent her early life living in London, Brussels and in Perthshire in Scotland. She married Captain Malcolm Moncrieff, a veteran of the Boer War, in 1914. They moved from Britain to New Zealand after the end of the First World War where they settled at Nelson, having originally planned to move to Canada. She was the first female President of the Royal Australasian Ornithologists Union (RAOU), 1932–1933. She first joined the organisation in 1923 and two years later published "New Zealand birds and how to identify them". The book was a success, with six editions published from 1925 through to 1961.

She is credited with being almost single-handedly responsible for setting aside land that would eventually be the Abel Tasman National Park. Moncrieff was awarded the Loder Cup in 1953. In the 1975 Queen's Birthday Honours, she was appointed a Commander of the Order of the British Empire, for services to conservation as a naturalist and to the Abel Tasman National Park. The government of the Netherlands awarded her the Order of Orange-Nassau in 1974, in recognition of her efforts to protect Abel Tasman NP, an area of significant importance in the history of Dutch exploration.

In 2017, Moncrieff was selected as one of the Royal Society Te Apārangi's "150 women in 150 words", celebrating the contributions of women to knowledge in New Zealand.

Publications
Books she authored include:
 Moncrieff, P. (1925). New Zealand Birds and How to Identify Them. Whitcombe & Tombs: Auckland. (Field-guide. 5 editions published to 1961) Colour plates by Lily A. Daff.
 Moncrieff, P. (1965). People Came Later. Author: Nelson.
 Moncrieff, P. (1976). The Rise and Fall of David Riccio. Ambassador: Wellington.

References

Further reading
 Robin, Libby. (2001). The Flight of the Emu: a hundred years of Australian ornithology 1901–2001. Carlton, Vic. Melbourne University Press. 

1893 births
1979 deaths
British emigrants to New Zealand
New Zealand ornithologists
New Zealand environmentalists
New Zealand women environmentalists
New Zealand Commanders of the Order of the British Empire
20th-century New Zealand zoologists
20th-century New Zealand women scientists
Women ornithologists